The following list of text-based games is not to be considered an authoritative, comprehensive listing of all such games; rather, it is intended to represent a wide range of game styles and genres presented using the text mode display and their evolution across a long period.

On mainframe computers
Years listed are those in which early mainframe games and others are believed to have originally appeared. Often these games were continually modified and played as a succession of versions for years after their initial posting. (For purposes of this list, minicomputers are considered mainframes, in contrast to microcomputers, which are not.)

On personal computers

Commercial text adventure games
These are commercial interactive fiction games played offline.

Miscellaneous games

Online games

Play-by-email games
These are play-by-email games played online.

BBS door games
These are BBS door games played online.

MUDs

See also
List of graphic adventure games

References

Text-based
 
MUDs